Arar (   ) is the capital of Northern Borders Province in Saudi Arabia. It has a population of 145,237 (2004 census).

Arar is located in northern Saudi Arabia near the Iraqi border. It is known for its fertile pasture lands which lends itself well to its principal occupation of sheep and camel herding. The population of the entire Northern Borders Province, including the cities of Rafha, Turayf and Alaoiqilah and suburban villages and their inhabitants, was 320,524 at the 2010 census. Arar serves as a significant supply stop for travelers on the Saudi Arabian highway 85.

History 
The city of Arar was founded in 1951, after the construction of the Aramco oil pipeline (Tapline) was completed. It was initially an oil pumping station with a health center and worker housing.  Workers at Arar were primarily from the regions of Al-Ahsa, Ha'il, Yanbu and Al Wajh.

Arar got its name from the original oil field that existed before the town, "Field RR", one of many in the country, where it was known by the locals as "R.R." which later became ʿArʿar. The name Arar means juniper in Arabic.

In 1968, the remains of an ancient city were unearthed 30 km from the city of Arar. The site yielded numerous sculptures of fish, turtles and other aquatic animals.

A summit meeting between King Saud and King Hussein of Jordan took place in Arar during the reigns of the two monarchs.

Iraqi Airways Flight 163, crashed near the 'Ar'ar airport on 25 December 1986. The plane was flying from Baghdad, Iraq to Amman, Jordan.

The Islamic State had planned to attack the city as part of their 2014 insurgency. On 5 January 2015 two Saudi border guards were killed in a suicide attack by the Islamic State at the Ar Ar Border Crossing. However, thereafter ISIS was diminished militarily by other events elsewhere and could not pursue further attacks in the city.

Geography 
Arar is located in the north of Saudi Arabia, in the heart of a vast rocky limestone plain. It lies about 1100 km northwest of Riyadh, and about 60 km from the Iraqi border.

Climate 
Köppen-Geiger climate classification system classifies the climate of Arar as hot desert (BWh). Winds generally blow from the east or west, rarely from the south. The rainfall in the region has declined gradually over recent years. Snow is not uncommon, falling on average every two to three years.

Notable people from Arar
 Amjed Bedewi, diplomat.
 Bander Faleh, football player.
 Ibn al-Khattab, mujahid warlord.

References

 
1951 establishments in Saudi Arabia
Populated places established in 1951
Populated places in Northern Borders Province
Provincial capitals of Saudi Arabia